Amarilla is a surname. Notable people with the surname include:

Alberto Guani Amarilla (born 1959), Uruguayan diplomat
Ángel Amarilla (born 1981), Paraguayan footballer
Carlos Amarilla (born 1970), Paraguayan football referee
Ever Amarilla (born 1984), Paraguayan footballer
Florencio Amarilla (1935–2012), Paraguayan footballer, coach and later actor
Gerardo Amarilla (born 1969), Uruguayan politician
Ignacio Amarilla (born 1986), Uruguayan footballer
José Amarilla, (born 1985), Argentinian footballer
Luis Amarilla (born 1995), Paraguayan footballer
Néstor Amarilla (born 1980), Paraguayan dramatist and playwright
Raúl Amarilla Romero (born 1988), Paraguayan footballer
Raúl Vicente Amarilla (born 1960), Paraguayan footballer

See also
Barba amarilla (disambiguation)
Carretera Amarilla / Tesalónica (Seville Metro), interchange station between metro services of Seville subway system, Andalusia
Casa Amarilla, railway station in the district of La Boca, Buenos Aires
Fuerza Amarilla S.C.,Ecuadorian football club based in Machala, Ecuador
Ithomia amarilla, ithomiine butterfly from the subfamily Danainae
La Ola Amarilla, professional wrestling group
Mata Amarilla Formation, formation is a stratigraphic division of Patagonia, Argentina
Tierra Amarilla, New Mexico, small unincorporated community near the Carson National Forest in the northern part of the U.S. state of New Mexico
Tierra Amarilla Air Force Station, closed United States Air Force General Surveillance Radar station
Tierra Amarilla, Chile, Chilean commune and city in Copiapó Province, Atacama Region
Tierra Amarilla Historic District, historic district which was listed on the US-National Register of Historic Places